Humongous Fungus (a colloquial name given to large mushrooms) may refer to:
 An Armillaria ostoyae specimen in Malheur National Forest in Oregon, covering 
 An Armillaria gallica specimen in Michigan, covering